Bram Tankink (born 3 December 1978) is a Dutch former professional road bicycle racer, who competed between 2000 and 2018 for the Löwik Meubelen–Tegeltoko,  and  squads.

Born in Haaksbergen, Tankink started his career as a mountain biker, but in 1999 he became a road rider. Tankink usually acted as a helper in this team, hardly ever racing for his own success; but he was so much appreciated that the team allowed him to participate in the 2005 Tour de France which he finished in good form. After the Tour he played an important part in the victory of Filippo Pozzato at the 2005 HEW Cyclassics in Hamburg and during the 2005 Deutschland Tour he won the first stage from Attenburg to Plauen. Tankink also won several criteriums after the Tour de France.

Tankink joined  in 2008. He remained with the team until his retirement in 2018.

Major results

1999
 3rd Overall Turul Romaniei
2000
 1st  Road race, National Under-23 Road Championships
 2nd Overall Mainfranken-Tour
 2nd Overall Ster der Beloften
 5th Rund um den Henninger Turm U23
 8th Overall Le Triptyque des Monts et Châteaux
 8th Overall Grand Prix Guillaume Tell
2004
 6th Japan Cup
 8th Tour du Haut Var
2005
 1st Profronde van Maastricht
 1st Profronde van Almelo
 1st Stage 1 Deutschland Tour
 3rd Profronde van Stiphout
 3rd Profronde van Oostvoorne
2006
 1st Mijl van Mares
 2nd Profronde van Almelo
 3rd GP Buchholz
 3rd Profronde van Stiphout
 7th Tour du Haut Var
2007
 1st Grote Prijs Jef Scherens
 1st Profronde van Maastricht
 3rd Acht van Chaam
 7th Overall Eneco Tour
 8th Grand Prix de Fourmies
2008
 1st Profronde van Wierden
 2nd Profronde van Zwolle
 3rd Profronde van Heerlen
 5th Overall Tour of Belgium
 8th Overall Eneco Tour
 8th Trofeo Calvia
 8th Grand Prix de Wallonie
 10th Overall Vuelta a Andalucía
2009
 3rd Profronde van Zwolle
 8th Overall Ster Elektrotoer
2010
 3rd Overall Tour of Belgium
2011
 1st  Sprints classification, Tour of the Basque Country
 1st Stage 1 (TTT) Tirreno–Adriatico
 2nd Road race, National Road Championships
 5th E3 Prijs Vlaanderen
 5th Brabantse Pijl
 5th Omloop van het Houtland
2013
 9th Ruddervoorde Koerse
2014
 6th Druivenkoers Overijse
 6th Omloop van het Houtland

Grand Tour general classification results timeline

References

External links 

  

1978 births
Living people
People from Haaksbergen
Dutch male cyclists
UCI Road World Championships cyclists for the Netherlands
Cyclists from Overijssel
20th-century Dutch people
21st-century Dutch people